A statue of Venustiano Carranza is installed in Guadalajara's Parque Revolución, in the Mexican state of Jalisco.

References

External links

 

Monuments and memorials in Jalisco
Outdoor sculptures in Guadalajara
Sculptures of men in Mexico
Statues in Jalisco